Beban is a village located in the Tel Kaif District of the Ninawa Governorate in northern Iraq. It belongs to the disputed territories of Northern Iraq. Beban has exclusively Yazidi population.

Etymology
The name Beban is derived from the Assyrian "Beth-Bane".

References

Populated places in Nineveh Governorate
Yazidi populated places in Iraq
Historic Assyrian communities in Iraq